Umm al Darda as Sughra al Dimashqiyyah  or Umm al Darda the Younger, was a 7th-century jurist and scholar of Islam in Damascus and Jerusalem. She is not to be confused with Umm al-Darda, wife of the sahaba Abu Darda.

Biography

Early life 
She was an orphan under the guardianship of Abul Darda. As a child, she used to sit with male scholars in the mosque, praying in men's rows and studying Quran with them. 
She remarked “I’ve tried to worship Allah in every way, but I’ve never found a better one than sitting around debating with other scholars.”

Teaching 
Besides holding her classes in the mosques of Damascus and Jerusalem she has been teaching in her house. As a teacher Umm al-Darda entered the men's section of the mosque (under any other circumstances a forbidden place for women).  She enjoyed having both female and male students. Even the caliph 'Abd al-Malik ibn Marwan must be noted as one of her classes often participant.

Being passionately devoted to teaching, Umm al-Darda has been teaching a large number of students. One day one student asked her about having many students: Have we wearied you? On that she answered that You (pl.) weary me? I have sought worship in everything. I did not find anything more relieving to me than sitting with scholars and exchanging knowledge with them.
Umm al-Darda has shown the piety, modesty and unpretentiousness both in her daily life and teaching asking no fee for delivering knowledge and living on the basis of charitable gifts.

Views
She issued a fatwa, which is still used today, allowing women to pray in the same sitting position (tashahhud) as men.

Ahmad ibn Hanbal related from Zayd ibn Aslam that he said:Abd al-Malik used to send an invitation to Umm Darda and she would spend as her guest, and he would ask her questions about the Prophet peace be upon him.

He said, 'He arose one night and called his maid servant but she came slowly and he cursed her, so she said, "Do not curse, for indeed Abud-Darda related to me that he heard the Messenger of Allah peace be upon him say, "Those who curse will not be witnesses or interceders on the Day of Judgement."Sahih Bukhari
She was regarded by Ibrahim ibn Abi Ablah as a pious and modest woman. In Ibn 'Asakir 's Ta'rikh madinat Dimashq, Tarajim al-nisa is written that: I saw Umm al-Darda in Jerusalim sitting among poor women. A man came and distributed some money among them. He gave Umm al-Darda a fals (a copper). She said to her servant: Buy camel meat with it. Is not that money sadaqah?Umm al-Darda said: it came to us unasked 

Legacy
Umm al-Darda was held by Iyas ibn Mu'awiya, an important traditionist of the time and a judge of undisputed ability and merit, to be superior to all the other traditionists of the period, including the celebrated masters of hadith like Hasan al-Basri and Ibn Sirin.

As it has been mentioned above, the name Umm Darda as Sughra and Umm al-Darda, wife of the sahaba or Companion, should not be confused. However, Mohammad Akram Nadwi in Al-Muhaddithat: the Women Scholars of Islam'' in the Index section doubles the same references for Abu Darda and Umm al-Darda, so doing this, he links the narration of Umm Darda as Sughra with Umm al-Darda as wife of Abu-Darda. Thus, it could be stated, that there was one women  named Umm al-Darda, an eminent hadith and fiqh scholar teaching in the mosques of Damascus and Jerusalim, lived in 7th century and joined the respectful attitude from the side of the caliph 'Abd al-Malik ibn Marwan.

A center for teaching Quran, hifz and tajwid to women has been established in Bahrain in her name.

References

7th-century Muslim scholars of Islam
Women scholars of the medieval Islamic world
7th-century jurists
Tabi‘un hadith narrators